The following is a list of all 1411  species in the genus Peperomia which are accepted by Plants of the World Online .

A

 Peperomia abbreviatipes 
 Peperomia abdita 
 Peperomia abnormis 
 Peperomia abrupteacutata 
 Peperomia × abscondita 
 Peperomia abyssinica 
 Peperomia acaulis 
 Peperomia aceramarcana 
 Peperomia aceroana 
 Peperomia acreana 
 Peperomia acuminata 
 Peperomia acuminatissima 
 Peperomia adamsonia 
 Peperomia adenocarpa 
 Peperomia adscendens 
 Peperomia adsurgens 
 Peperomia aerea 
 Peperomia aggregata 
 Peperomia aguabonitensis 
 Peperomia aguaditana 
 Peperomia aguilae 
 Peperomia agusanensis 
 Peperomia ainana 
 Peperomia alata 
 Peperomia alatiscapa 
 Peperomia albert-smithii 
 Peperomia albertiana 
 Peperomia albidiflora 
 Peperomia albolineata 
 Peperomia albonervosa 
 Peperomia albopilosa 
 Peperomia albovittata 
 Peperomia aldrinii 
 Peperomia alegrensis 
 Peperomia alibacophylla 
 Peperomia alismifolia 
 Peperomia alpina 
 Peperomia alternifolia 
 Peperomia alwynii 
 Peperomia ambiguifolia 
 Peperomia amphitricha 
 Peperomia ampla 
 Peperomia amplexicaulis 
 Peperomia amplexifolia 
 Peperomia andicola 
 Peperomia andina 
 Peperomia andrei 
 Peperomia angularis 
 Peperomia angustata 
 Peperomia ankaranensis 
 Peperomia anomala 
 Peperomia antioquiensis 
 Peperomia antoniana 
 Peperomia apiahyensis 
 Peperomia apodophylla 
 Peperomia apurimacana 
 Peperomia arboricola 
 Peperomia arborigaudens 
 Peperomia arboriseda 
 Peperomia arbuscula 
 Peperomia arctebaccata 
 Peperomia arcuatispica 
 Peperomia arenillasensis 
 Peperomia areolata 
 Peperomia argenteobracteata 
 Peperomia argyreia 
 Peperomia argyroneura 
 Peperomia arifolia 
 Peperomia aristeguietae 
 Peperomia armadana 
 Peperomia armondii 
 Peperomia armstrongii 
 Peperomia aroensis 
 Peperomia arthurii 
 Peperomia asarifolia 
 Peperomia asarifolioides 
 Peperomia asperula 
 Peperomia asplundii 
 Peperomia asterophylla 
 Peperomia astyla 
 Peperomia attenuata 
 Peperomia augescens 
 Peperomia aurorana 
 Peperomia austin-smithii 
 Peperomia australana 
 Peperomia ayacuchoana

B

 Peperomia bajana 
 Peperomia balansana 
 Peperomia balfourii 
 Peperomia bamleri 
 Peperomia bangii 
 Peperomia bangroana 
 Peperomia barahonana 
 Peperomia barbarana 
 Peperomia barbaranoides 
 Peperomia barbata 
 Peperomia barbulata 
 Peperomia barbulipetiola 
 Peperomia baronii 
 Peperomia barryana 
 Peperomia basiradicans 
 Peperomia bavina 
 Peperomia beccarii 
 Peperomia beckeri 
 Peperomia bella 
 Peperomia bellatula 
 Peperomia bellendenkerensis 
 Peperomia berlandieri 
 Peperomia bermudezana 
 Peperomia bernhardiana 
 Peperomia bernieriana 
 Peperomia bernouillii 
 Peperomia berryi 
 Peperomia berteroana 
 Peperomia bethaniana 
 Peperomia biamenta 
 Peperomia bicolor 
 Peperomia biformis 
 Peperomia bilobulata 
 Peperomia bismarckiana 
 Peperomia biuncialis 
 Peperomia blackii 
 Peperomia blanda 
 Peperomia blephariphylla 
 Peperomia blepharipus 
 Peperomia boekei 
 Peperomia boivinii 
 Peperomia boliviensis 
 Peperomia boninsimensis 
 Peperomia bopiana 
 Peperomia borbonensis 
 Peperomia borburatensis 
 Peperomia botterii 
 Peperomia bourneae 
 Peperomia brachyphylla 
 Peperomia brachypoda 
 Peperomia brachytricha 
 Peperomia bracteata 
 Peperomia bracteispica 
 Peperomia bradei 
 Peperomia brasiliensis 
 Peperomia breedlovei 
 Peperomia brevihirtella 
 Peperomia breviramula 
 Peperomia brevispica 
 Peperomia brittonii 
 Peperomia brouetiana 
 Peperomia bryophila 
 Peperomia buchtienii 
 Peperomia buxifolia

C

 Peperomia cacaophila 
 Peperomia cachabiana 
 Peperomia caducifolia 
 Peperomia caespitosa 
 Peperomia cainarachiana 
 Peperomia calcicola 
 Peperomia caledonica 
 Peperomia caliginigaudens 
 Peperomia callana 
 Peperomia callophylla 
 Peperomia calvescens 
 Peperomia calvicaulis 
 Peperomia calvifolia 
 Peperomia campana 
 Peperomia campinasana 
 Peperomia camposii 
 Peperomia camptotricha 
 Peperomia canalensis 
 Peperomia canaminana 
 Peperomia candelaber 
 Peperomia candida 
 Peperomia caniana 
 Peperomia canlaonensis 
 Peperomia caperata 
 Peperomia capitis-bovis 
 Peperomia caraboboensis 
 Peperomia cardenasii 
 Peperomia carnevalii 
 Peperomia carnicaulis 
 Peperomia carnifolia 
 Peperomia carpapatana 
 Peperomia carpinterana 
 Peperomia casapiana 
 Peperomia casarettoi 
 Peperomia castelosensis 
 Peperomia castilloi 
 Peperomia catharinae 
 Peperomia caucana 
 Peperomia cavaleriei 
 Peperomia cavispicata 
 Peperomia celiae 
 Peperomia cerea 
 Peperomia cereoides 
 Peperomia ceroderma 
 Peperomia cerrateae 
 Peperomia chalhuapuquiana 
 Peperomia chanchamayana 
 Peperomia chapensis 
 Peperomia chazaroi 
 Peperomia chicamochana 
 Peperomia chigorodoana 
 Peperomia chimboana 
 Peperomia chlorodisca 
 Peperomia choritana 
 Peperomia choroniana 
 Peperomia christophersenii 
 Peperomia chutanka 
 Peperomia ciezae 
 Peperomia ciliaris 
 Peperomia ciliata 
 Peperomia ciliatifolia 
 Peperomia ciliatocaespitosa 
 Peperomia cilifolia 
 Peperomia ciliifolia 
 Peperomia ciliolata 
 Peperomia ciliolibractea 
 Peperomia ciliosa 
 Peperomia circinnata 
 Peperomia cladara 
 Peperomia claudii 
 Peperomia claussenii 
 Peperomia clavatispica 
 Peperomia clavigera 
 Peperomia claytonioides 
 Peperomia clivicola 
 Peperomia clivigaudens 
 Peperomia clusiifolia 
 Peperomia coatzacoalcosensis 
 Peperomia cobana 
 Peperomia cochinensis 
 Peperomia cocleana 
 Peperomia cogniauxii 
 Peperomia collinsii 
 Peperomia coloniae 
 Peperomia colorata 
 Peperomia colossina 
 Peperomia columella 
 Peperomia columnaris 
 Peperomia comaltitlanensis 
 Peperomia comarapana 
 Peperomia commersonii 
 Peperomia concava 
 Peperomia confertispica 
 Peperomia congerro 
 Peperomia congesta 
 Peperomia congestispica 
 Peperomia congona 
 Peperomia conjugata 
 Peperomia connixa 
 Peperomia conocarpa 
 Peperomia consoquitlana 
 Peperomia conturbans 
 Peperomia convexa 
 Peperomia cookiana 
 Peperomia copelandii 
 Peperomia coquimbensis 
 Peperomia corcovadensis 
 Peperomia cordata 
 Peperomia cordigera 
 Peperomia cordovana 
 Peperomia cordulata 
 Peperomia cordulatiformis 
 Peperomia cordulilimba 
 Peperomia coroicoensis 
 Peperomia costata 
 Peperomia cotoneasterifolia 
 Peperomia cotyledon 
 Peperomia coulteri 
 Peperomia cowanii 
 Peperomia crassicaulis 
 Peperomia crassispica 
 Peperomia crassulicaulis 
 Peperomia crinicaulis 
 Peperomia crinigera 
 Peperomia crispa 
 Peperomia crispipetiola 
 Peperomia croizatiana 
 Peperomia crotalophora 
 Peperomia cruentata 
 Peperomia crusculibacca 
 Peperomia cruzeirensis 
 Peperomia crypticola 
 Peperomia cryptostachya 
 Peperomia crystallina 
 Peperomia cubensis 
 Peperomia cubugonana 
 Peperomia cuchumatanica 
 Peperomia cumbreana 
 Peperomia cundinamarcana 
 Peperomia cuprea 
 Peperomia cupularis 
 Peperomia curruciformis 
 Peperomia curticaulis 
 Peperomia curtipes 
 Peperomia curtispica 
 Peperomia cushiana 
 Peperomia cusilluyocana 
 Peperomia cuspidata 
 Peperomia cuspidilimba 
 Peperomia cyclaminoides 
 Peperomia cyclophylla 
 Peperomia cymbifolia

D

 Peperomia daguana 
 Peperomia dahlstedtii 
 Peperomia damazioi 
 Peperomia darienensis 
 Peperomia dasystachya 
 Peperomia dauleana 
 Peperomia davidsoniae 
 Peperomia debilipes 
 Peperomia deceptrix 
 Peperomia decora 
 Peperomia decumbens 
 Peperomia deficiens 
 Peperomia defoliata 
 Peperomia degeneri 
 Peperomia delascioi 
 Peperomia delicatula 
 Peperomia dendrophila 
 Peperomia densifolia 
 Peperomia dependens 
 Peperomia deppeana 
 Peperomia diamantinensis 
 Peperomia diaphanoides 
 Peperomia dichotoma 
 Peperomia dimota 
 Peperomia discifolia 
 Peperomia discilimba 
 Peperomia discolor 
 Peperomia disjunctiflora 
 Peperomia dissimilis 
 Peperomia distachyos 
 Peperomia disticha 
 Peperomia divaricata 
 Peperomia diversifolia 
 Peperomia doellii 
 Peperomia dolabella 
 Peperomia dolabriformis 
 Peperomia dominicana 
 Peperomia donaguiana 
 Peperomia dondonensis 
 Peperomia dorstenioides 
 Peperomia dotana 
 Peperomia drapeta 
 Peperomia drusophila 
 Peperomia dryadum 
 Peperomia duartei 
 Peperomia dubia 
 Peperomia duendensis 
 Peperomia duricaulis 
 Peperomia dusenii 
 Peperomia dyscrita

E

 Peperomia ebingeri 
 Peperomia eburnea 
 Peperomia ecuadorensis 
 Peperomia edulis 
 Peperomia eekana 
 Peperomia effusa 
 Peperomia efimbriata 
 Peperomia eggersii 
 Peperomia egleri 
 Peperomia ekakesara 
 Peperomia elata 
 Peperomia elatior 
 Peperomia elegantifolia 
 Peperomia elliptica 
 Peperomia ellipticibacca 
 Peperomia ellipticorhombea 
 Peperomia ellsworthii 
 Peperomia elmeri 
 Peperomia elsana 
 Peperomia emarginata 
 Peperomia emarginatifolia 
 Peperomia emarginella 
 Peperomia emarginulata 
 Peperomia emiliana 
 Peperomia enckeifolia 
 Peperomia endlichii 
 Peperomia enenyasensis 
 Peperomia × enervis 
 Peperomia epidendron 
 Peperomia epilobioides 
 Peperomia epipetrica 
 Peperomia epipremnifolia 
 Peperomia erosa 
 Peperomia erythrocaulis 
 Peperomia erythropremna 
 Peperomia erythrospicata 
 Peperomia erythrostachya 
 Peperomia esmeraldana 
 Peperomia esperanzana 
 Peperomia espinosae 
 Peperomia estaminea 
 Peperomia estrellana 
 Peperomia ewanii 
 Peperomia exclamationis 
 Peperomia exigua 
 Peperomia exiguispica 
 Peperomia exilamenta 
 Peperomia exiliramea 
 Peperomia expallescens

F

 Peperomia fagerlindii 
 Peperomia falanana 
 Peperomia falcata 
 Peperomia falconensis 
 Peperomia falsa 
 Peperomia famelica 
 Peperomia farctifolia 
 Peperomia fawcettii 
 Peperomia fendleriana 
 Peperomia fernandeziana 
 Peperomia fernandopoiana 
 Peperomia ferreyrae 
 Peperomia ficta 
 Peperomia filicaulis 
 Peperomia filiformis 
 Peperomia fissicola 
 Peperomia fissispica 
 Peperomia flabilis 
 Peperomia flavamenta 
 Peperomia flavescens 
 Peperomia flavescentifolia 
 Peperomia flavida 
 Peperomia flexicaulis 
 Peperomia flexinervia 
 Peperomia fluviatilis 
 Peperomia foliata 
 Peperomia foliiflora 
 Peperomia foliosa 
 Peperomia folsomii 
 Peperomia fosbergii 
 Peperomia fournieri 
 Peperomia foveolata 
 Peperomia fragilis 
 Peperomia fragilissima 
 Peperomia fragrans 
 Peperomia fragrantissima 
 Peperomia franciscoi 
 Peperomia fraseri 
 Peperomia fruticetorum 
 Peperomia fuertesii 
 Peperomia fugax 
 Peperomia fulvescens 
 Peperomia fundacionensis 
 Peperomia furcata 
 Peperomia fuscipunctata 
 Peperomia fuscispica 
 Peperomia futunaensis

G

 Peperomia gabinetensis 
 Peperomia galapagensis 
 Peperomia galioides 
 Peperomia garcia-barrigana 
 Peperomia gardneriana 
 Peperomia gaultheriifolia 
 Peperomia gayi 
 Peperomia gedehana 
 Peperomia gehrigeri 
 Peperomia gemella 
 Peperomia geminispica 
 Peperomia gentryi 
 Peperomia gerardoi 
 Peperomia gibba 
 Peperomia gigantea 
 Peperomia giralana 
 Peperomia glabella 
 Peperomia glabrilimba 
 Peperomia glabrirhachis 
 Peperomia glandulosa 
 Peperomia glareosa 
 Peperomia glassmanii 
 Peperomia glauca 
 Peperomia glaziovii 
 Peperomia gleicheniiformis 
 Peperomia globosibacca 
 Peperomia globulanthera 
 Peperomia gorgonillana 
 Peperomia goudotii 
 Peperomia gracieana 
 Peperomia gracilicaulis 
 Peperomia gracilis 
 Peperomia gracilispica 
 Peperomia gracillima 
 Peperomia grantii 
 Peperomia granulata 
 Peperomia granulatifolia 
 Peperomia granulatilimba 
 Peperomia granulosa 
 Peperomia graveolens 
 Peperomia grayumii 
 Peperomia griggsii 
 Peperomia grisarii 
 Peperomia grisebachii 
 Peperomia griseoargentea 
 Peperomia gruendleri 
 Peperomia guadaloupensis 
 Peperomia guadalupana 
 Peperomia guaiquinimana 
 Peperomia guanensis 
 Peperomia guapilesiana 
 Peperomia guarujana 
 Peperomia guatemalensis 
 Peperomia guayrapurana 
 Peperomia gucayana 
 Peperomia gutierrezana 
 Peperomia guttulata 
 Peperomia gymnophylla

H

 Peperomia hadrostachya 
 Peperomia haematolepis 
 Peperomia haenkeana 
 Peperomia hallieri 
 Peperomia hamiltonianifolia 
 Peperomia hammelii 
 Peperomia harlingii 
 Peperomia harmandii 
 Peperomia harrisii 
 Peperomia hartmannii 
 Peperomia hartwegiana 
 Peperomia haughtii 
 Peperomia hebetata 
 Peperomia hedyotidea 
 Peperomia hemmendorffii 
 Peperomia hendersonensis 
 Peperomia heptaphylla 
 Peperomia hernandiifolia 
 Peperomia herrerae 
 Peperomia herzogii 
 Peperomia hesperomannii 
 Peperomia heterodoxa 
 Peperomia heterophylla 
 Peperomia heterostachya 
 Peperomia heyneana 
 Peperomia hilariana 
 Peperomia hildebrandtii 
 Peperomia hintonii 
 Peperomia hirta 
 Peperomia hirtella 
 Peperomia hirtellicaulis 
 Peperomia hirticaulis 
 Peperomia hirtipeduncula 
 Peperomia hirtipetiola 
 Peperomia hispidosa 
 Peperomia hispidula 
 Peperomia hispiduliformis 
 Peperomia hobbitoides 
 Peperomia hodgei 
 Peperomia hoelscheri 
 Peperomia hoffmannii 
 Peperomia hombronii 
 Peperomia honigii 
 Peperomia huacapistanana 
 Peperomia huallagana 
 Peperomia huantana 
 Peperomia huanucoana 
 Peperomia huatuscoana 
 Peperomia huberi 
 Peperomia humbertii 
 Peperomia humifusa 
 Peperomia humilis 
 Peperomia hunteriana 
 Peperomia hutchisonii 
 Peperomia hydnostachya 
 Peperomia hydrocotyloides 
 Peperomia hygrophiloides 
 Peperomia hylophila 
 Peperomia hypoleuca 
 Peperomia hyporhoda

I

 Peperomia ibiramana 
 Peperomia ilaloensis 
 Peperomia imerinae 
 Peperomia immolata 
 Peperomia inaequalifolia 
 Peperomia inaequalilimba 
 Peperomia inaequilatera 
 Peperomia incana 
 Peperomia incisa 
 Peperomia incognita 
 Peperomia inconspicua 
 Peperomia increscens 
 Peperomia induratifolia 
 Peperomia infralutea 
 Peperomia infravillosa 
 Peperomia inquilina 
 Peperomia insueta 
 Peperomia involucrata 
 Peperomia irrasa 
 Peperomia itatiaiana 
 Peperomia itayana

J

 Peperomia jalcaensis 
 Peperomia jamaicana 
 Peperomia jamesoniana 
 Peperomia japonica 
 Peperomia josei 
 Peperomia junghuhniana 
 Peperomia juniniana 
 Peperomia juruana

K

 Peperomia kalimatina 
 Peperomia kamerunana 
 Peperomia kerinciensis 
 Peperomia kimnachii 
 Peperomia kipahuluensis 
 Peperomia kjellii 
 Peperomia klopfensteinii 
 Peperomia klotzschiana 
 Peperomia klugiana 
 Peperomia kokeana 
 Peperomia kotana 
 Peperomia kraemeri 
 Peperomia kravangensis 
 Peperomia kuhliana 
 Peperomia kuntzei 
 Peperomia kusaiensis

L

 Peperomia laeteviridis 
 Peperomia laevifolia 
 Peperomia laevilimba 
 Peperomia lagunaensis 
 Peperomia lanaoensis 
 Peperomia lanceolata 
 Peperomia lanceolatopeltata 
 Peperomia lancifolia 
 Peperomia lanosa 
 Peperomia lanuginosa 
 Peperomia lasierrana 
 Peperomia lasiophylla 
 Peperomia lasiorhachis 
 Peperomia lasiostigma 
 Peperomia latibracteata 
 Peperomia latifolia 
 Peperomia latilimba 
 Peperomia latimerana 
 Peperomia lauterbachii 
 Peperomia lawrancei 
 Peperomia laxiflora 
 Peperomia ledermannii 
 Peperomia lehmannii 
 Peperomia leptophylla 
 Peperomia leptostachya 
 Peperomia leptostachyoides 
 Peperomia leucanthera 
 Peperomia leucorrhachis 
 Peperomia leucostachya 
 Peperomia lewisii 
 Peperomia liclicensis 
 Peperomia liebmannii 
 Peperomia liesneri 
 Peperomia lifuana 
 Peperomia lignescens 
 Peperomia ligustrina 
 Peperomia lilliputiana 
 Peperomia limana 
 Peperomia linaresii 
 Peperomia lindeniana 
 Peperomia lineatipila 
 Peperomia litana 
 Peperomia loefgrenii 
 Peperomia lonchophylloides 
 Peperomia longepedunculata 
 Peperomia longipetiolata 
 Peperomia longipila 
 Peperomia longisetosa 
 Peperomia lorentzii 
 Peperomia loucoubeana 
 Peperomia loxensis 
 Peperomia lyallii 
 Peperomia lyman-smithii

M

 Peperomia macbrideana 
 Peperomia macedoana 
 Peperomia macraeana 
 Peperomia macrandra 
 Peperomia macrorhiza 
 Peperomia macrorostrum 
 Peperomia macrostachyos 
 Peperomia macrothyrsa 
 Peperomia macrotricha 
 Peperomia maculosa 
 Peperomia madagascariensis 
 Peperomia maestrana 
 Peperomia magnifoliiflora 
 Peperomia magnoliifolia 
 Peperomia maguirei 
 Peperomia maijeri 
 Peperomia majalis 
 Peperomia mameiana 
 Peperomia manabina 
 Peperomia manarae 
 Peperomia mandioccana 
 Peperomia mantadiana 
 Peperomia mantaroana 
 Peperomia marahuacensis 
 Peperomia maransara 
 Peperomia marcapatana 
 Peperomia marchionensis 
 Peperomia marcoana 
 Peperomia margaritifera 
 Peperomia mariannensis 
 Peperomia marivelesana 
 Peperomia marmorata 
 Peperomia marshalliana 
 Peperomia martiana 
 Peperomia masuthoniana 
 Peperomia mathewsiana 
 Peperomia mathieui 
 Peperomia matlalucaensis 
 Peperomia mauiensis 
 Peperomia maxonii 
 Peperomia maxwellana 
 Peperomia maypurensis 
 Peperomia meeboldii 
 Peperomia megalepis 
 Peperomia megalopoda 
 Peperomia megapotamica 
 Peperomia melanokirrocarpa 
 Peperomia melanosticta 
 Peperomia melinii 
 Peperomia membranacea 
 Peperomia mercedana 
 Peperomia meridana 
 Peperomia merrillii 
 Peperomia mesitasana 
 Peperomia metallica 
 Peperomia metcalfii 
 Peperomia mexicana 
 Peperomia microlepis 
 Peperomia micromamillata 
 Peperomia micromerioides 
 Peperomia microphylla 
 Peperomia microphyllophora 
 Peperomia microstachya 
 Peperomia millei 
 Peperomia mindoroensis 
 Peperomia minensis 
 Peperomia minuta 
 Peperomia miqueliana 
 Peperomia mishuyacana 
 Peperomia mitchelioides 
 Peperomia mitoensis 
 Peperomia mixtifolia 
 Peperomia mocoana 
 Peperomia mocquerysii 
 Peperomia modicilimba 
 Peperomia molleri 
 Peperomia mollicaulis 
 Peperomia mollis 
 Peperomia mollisoides 
 Peperomia monostachya 
 Peperomia montana 
 Peperomia montecristana 
 Peperomia monticola 
 Peperomia moralesii 
 Peperomia moreliana 
 Peperomia morungavana 
 Peperomia mosenii 
 Peperomia moulmeiniana 
 Peperomia moyobambana 
 Peperomia multifolia 
 Peperomia multiformis 
 Peperomia multispica 
 Peperomia multisurcula 
 Peperomia muscicola 
 Peperomia muscigaudens 
 Peperomia muscipara 
 Peperomia muscophila 
 Peperomia mutilata 
 Peperomia myrtifolia

N

 Peperomia naevifolia 
 Peperomia naitasiriensis 
 Peperomia nakaharae 
 Peperomia namosiana 
 Peperomia nandalana 
 Peperomia nandarivatensis 
 Peperomia naranjoana 
 Peperomia naviculifolia 
 Peperomia neblinana 
 Peperomia negrosensis 
 Peperomia nequejahuirana 
 Peperomia nervosovenosa 
 Peperomia nicolliae 
 Peperomia nigricans 
 Peperomia nigro-oculata 
 Peperomia nigroungulata 
 Peperomia nitida 
 Peperomia nivalis 
 Peperomia nizaitoensis 
 Peperomia nodosa 
 Peperomia non-alata 
 Peperomia nopalana 
 Peperomia nossibeana 
 Peperomia novemnervia 
 Peperomia nudicaulis 
 Peperomia nudifolia 
 Peperomia nummularioides

O

 Peperomia oahuensis 
 Peperomia obcordata 
 Peperomia obcordatifolia 
 Peperomia obex 
 Peperomia oblancifolia 
 Peperomia obliqua 
 Peperomia obovalifolia 
 Peperomia obovalis 
 Peperomia obovatilimba 
 Peperomia obruenda 
 Peperomia obscurifolia 
 Peperomia obtusifolia 
 Peperomia occulta 
 Peperomia ocoana 
 Peperomia ocrosensis 
 Peperomia ocumarana 
 Peperomia oerstedii 
 Peperomia olafiana 
 Peperomia olivacea 
 Peperomia oliveri 
 Peperomia ollantaitambona 
 Peperomia ophistachyera 
 Peperomia orbiculimba 
 Peperomia oreophila 
 Peperomia oscarii 
 Peperomia ottoniana 
 Peperomia ouabianae 
 Peperomia ovatolanceolata 
 Peperomia ovatopeltata 
 Peperomia oxycarpa 
 Peperomia oxyphylla

P

 Peperomia pachiteana 
 Peperomia pachydermis 
 Peperomia pachystachya 
 Peperomia painteri 
 Peperomia pakipski 
 Peperomia palcana 
 Peperomia pallens 
 Peperomia pallescens 
 Peperomia pallida 
 Peperomia pallidibacca 
 Peperomia pallidinervis 
 Peperomia palmana 
 Peperomia palmiformis 
 Peperomia palmirensis 
 Peperomia pampalcana 
 Peperomia pandiana 
 Peperomia pangerangoana 
 Peperomia papillispica 
 Peperomia papillosa 
 Peperomia paradoxa 
 Peperomia paramuna 
 Peperomia parasitica 
 Peperomia parastriata 
 Peperomia parcicilia 
 Peperomia parcifolia 
 Peperomia parcipeltata 
 Peperomia parhamii 
 Peperomia pariensis 
 Peperomia parnassiifolia 
 Peperomia parva 
 Peperomia parvibacca 
 Peperomia parvibractea 
 Peperomia parvicaulis 
 Peperomia parvifolia 
 Peperomia parvilimba 
 Peperomia parvipunctulata 
 Peperomia parvisagittata 
 Peperomia parvulifolia 
 Peperomia pasionana 
 Peperomia patula 
 Peperomia pavoniana 
 Peperomia pearcei 
 Peperomia peckelii 
 Peperomia pecuniifolia 
 Peperomia pedicellata 
 Peperomia pedunculata 
 Peperomia pellucida 
 Peperomia pellucidoides 
 Peperomia pellucidopunctulata 
 Peperomia peltaphylla 
 Peperomia peltifolia 
 Peperomia peltigera 
 Peperomia peltilimba 
 Peperomia peltoidea 
 Peperomia pendulicaulis 
 Peperomia penduliramea 
 Peperomia penicillata 
 Peperomia pentadactyla 
 Peperomia peploides 
 Peperomia percalvescens 
 Peperomia perciliata 
 Peperomia pereirae 
 Peperomia pereneana 
 Peperomia pereskiifolia 
 Peperomia perforata 
 Peperomia perglandulosa 
 Peperomia perherbacea 
 Peperomia perlongicaulis 
 Peperomia perlongipedunculata 
 Peperomia perlongipes 
 Peperomia perlongispica 
 Peperomia pernambucensis 
 Peperomia perodiniana 
 Peperomia persuculenta 
 Peperomia persulcata 
 Peperomia pertomentella 
 Peperomia peruviana 
 Peperomia petiolaris 
 Peperomia petiolata 
 Peperomia petraea 
 Peperomia petrophila 
 Peperomia philipsonii 
 Peperomia phyllanthopsis 
 Peperomia physostachya 
 Peperomia pichinchae 
 Peperomia pichisensis 
 Peperomia pilicaulis 
 Peperomia pilifera 
 Peperomia pilipetiolata 
 Peperomia pillahuatana 
 Peperomia pilosa 
 Peperomia pilostigma 
 Peperomia pinedoana 
 Peperomia pinoi 
 Peperomia piresii 
 Peperomia pitcairnensis 
 Peperomia pitiguayana 
 Peperomia pittieri 
 Peperomia playapampana 
 Peperomia pleiomorpha 
 Peperomia plicata 
 Peperomia plicatifolia 
 Peperomia plurispica 
 Peperomia pluvisilvatica 
 Peperomia poasana 
 Peperomia poeppigii 
 Peperomia polybotrya 
 Peperomia polycephala 
 Peperomia polymorpha 
 Peperomia polystachya 
 Peperomia polystachyoides 
 Peperomia polzii 
 Peperomia ponapensis 
 Peperomia pongoana 
 Peperomia pontina 
 Peperomia popayanensis 
 Peperomia porphyridea 
 Peperomia porriginifera 
 Peperomia portobellensis 
 Peperomia portoricensis 
 Peperomia portuguesensis 
 Peperomia portulacoides 
 Peperomia potamophila 
 Peperomia ppucu-ppucu 
 Peperomia praematura 
 Peperomia praeruptorum 
 Peperomia pringlei 
 Peperomia proctorii 
 Peperomia procumbens 
 Peperomia productamenta 
 Peperomia profissa 
 Peperomia prolifera 
 Peperomia propugnaculi 
 Peperomia prostrata 
 Peperomia pseudoalpina 
 Peperomia pseudoalternifolia 
 Peperomia pseudoasarifolia 
 Peperomia pseudobcordata 
 Peperomia pseudocasaretti 
 Peperomia pseudocobana 
 Peperomia pseudoelata 
 Peperomia pseudoestrellensis 
 Peperomia pseudofurcata 
 Peperomia pseudoglabella 
 Peperomia pseudohirta 
 Peperomia pseudohodgei 
 Peperomia pseudomaculosa 
 Peperomia pseudopereskiifolia 
 Peperomia pseudoperuviana 
 Peperomia pseudophyllantha 
 Peperomia pseudorhombea 
 Peperomia pseudorhynchophoros 
 Peperomia pseudorufescens 
 Peperomia pseudosalicifolia 
 Peperomia pseudoserratirhachis 
 Peperomia pseudoumbilicata 
 Peperomia pseudovariegata 
 Peperomia pseudoverruculosa 
 Peperomia psilophylla 
 Peperomia psilostachya 
 Peperomia pteroneura 
 Peperomia puberulescens 
 Peperomia puberulibacca 
 Peperomia puberulicaulis 
 Peperomia puberuliformis 
 Peperomia puberulilimba 
 Peperomia puberulipes 
 Peperomia puberulirhachis 
 Peperomia puberulispica 
 Peperomia pubescens 
 Peperomia pubescentinervis 
 Peperomia pubicaulis 
 Peperomia pubilimba 
 Peperomia pubinervosa 
 Peperomia pubipeduncula 
 Peperomia pubipetiola 
 Peperomia pubiramea 
 Peperomia pubirhachis 
 Peperomia puerto-ospinana 
 Peperomia pugnicaudex 
 Peperomia pulchella 
 Peperomia pullispica 
 Peperomia pululaguana 
 Peperomia pumila 
 Peperomia punctatilamina 
 Peperomia punctulatissima 
 Peperomia punicea 
 Peperomia purpurea 
 Peperomia purpureonervosa 
 Peperomia purpurinervis 
 Peperomia purpurinodis 
 Peperomia purpurispicata 
 Peperomia pusilla 
 Peperomia putlaensis 
 Peperomia putumayoensis 
 Peperomia pyramidata 
 Peperomia pyrifolia

Q

 Peperomia quadrangularis 
 Peperomia quadratifolia 
 Peperomia quadricoma 
 Peperomia quadrifolia 
 Peperomia quaerata 
 Peperomia quaesita 
 Peperomia quaifei 
 Peperomia querocochana 
 Peperomia questionis 
 Peperomia quimiriana 
 Peperomia quispicanchiana

R

 Peperomia racemifolia 
 Peperomia radiatinervosa 
 Peperomia radicosa 
 Peperomia ramboi 
 Peperomia rapensis 
 Peperomia ratticaudata 
 Peperomia rauniensis 
 Peperomia rechingerae 
 Peperomia recurvata 
 Peperomia reflexa 
 Peperomia regelii 
 Peperomia reineckei 
 Peperomia remyi 
 Peperomia renifolia 
 Peperomia reptans 
 Peperomia reptilis 
 Peperomia reticulata 
 Peperomia retivenulosa 
 Peperomia retropuberula 
 Peperomia retusa 
 Peperomia rhexiifolia 
 Peperomia rhodophylla 
 Peperomia rhombea 
 Peperomia rhombeifolia 
 Peperomia rhombeoelliptica 
 Peperomia rhombifolia 
 Peperomia rhombiformis 
 Peperomia rhombilimba 
 Peperomia rhomboidea 
 Peperomia ricaurtensis 
 Peperomia richardsonii 
 Peperomia ridleyi 
 Peperomia riedeliana 
 Peperomia rigidicaulis 
 Peperomia rioblancoana 
 Peperomia riocaliensis 
 Peperomia riparia 
 Peperomia ripicola 
 Peperomia rivulamans 
 Peperomia rivulorum 
 Peperomia rizzinii 
 Peperomia robleana 
 Peperomia robusta 
 Peperomia robustior 
 Peperomia rockii 
 Peperomia rodriguesiana 
 Peperomia rosea 
 Peperomia roseopetiolata 
 Peperomia rossii 
 Peperomia rosulatiformis 
 Peperomia rotumaensis 
 Peperomia rotundata 
 Peperomia rotundifolia 
 Peperomia rotundilimba 
 Peperomia roxburghiana 
 Peperomia rubea 
 Peperomia rubens 
 Peperomia rubescens 
 Peperomia rubramenta 
 Peperomia rubricaulis 
 Peperomia rubrifolia 
 Peperomia rubrimaculata 
 Peperomia rubrinodis 
 Peperomia rubripetiola 
 Peperomia rubrivenosa 
 Peperomia rubropunctulata 
 Peperomia rufescens 
 Peperomia rufescentifolia 
 Peperomia rufispica 
 Peperomia rugata 
 Peperomia rugatifolia 
 Peperomia rugosa 
 Peperomia rupiceda 
 Peperomia rupicola 
 Peperomia rupigaudens 
 Peperomia rurrenabaqueana 
 Peperomia rusbyi 
 Peperomia ruscifolia

S

 Peperomia sabaletasana 
 Peperomia sachatzinzumba 
 Peperomia sagittata 
 Peperomia saintpauliella 
 Peperomia salaminana 
 Peperomia salangonis 
 Peperomia salicifolia 
 Peperomia saligna 
 Peperomia salmonicolor 
 Peperomia samainiae 
 Peperomia samoensis 
 Peperomia san-carlosiana 
 Peperomia san-felipensis 
 Peperomia san-joseana 
 Peperomia san-roqueana 
 Peperomia sanblasensis 
 Peperomia sandemanii 
 Peperomia sandwicensis 
 Peperomia sangabanensis 
 Peperomia sanquininiana 
 Peperomia sansalvadorana 
 Peperomia santa-elisae 
 Peperomia santa-helenae 
 Peperomia santanderiana 
 Peperomia santiagoana 
 Peperomia sarasinii 
 Peperomia saxicola 
 Peperomia scabiosa 
 Peperomia schenckiana 
 Peperomia schizandra 
 Peperomia schlechteri 
 Peperomia schmidtii 
 Peperomia schneepeana 
 Peperomia schultzei 
 Peperomia schunkeana 
 Peperomia schwackei 
 Peperomia sclerophylla 
 Peperomia scopulorum 
 Peperomia scutaleifolia 
 Peperomia scutellariifolia 
 Peperomia scutellifolia 
 Peperomia scutifolia 
 Peperomia scutilimba 
 Peperomia secunda 
 Peperomia seemanniana 
 Peperomia segregata 
 Peperomia seibertii 
 Peperomia selenophylla 
 Peperomia seleri 
 Peperomia semimetralis 
 Peperomia semipuberula 
 Peperomia seposita 
 Peperomia septemnervis 
 Peperomia septentrionalis 
 Peperomia serpens 
 Peperomia serratirhachis 
 Peperomia sierpeana 
 Peperomia silvarum 
 Peperomia silvicola 
 Peperomia silvivaga 
 Peperomia similis 
 Peperomia simplex 
 Peperomia simulans 
 Peperomia simuliformis 
 Peperomia sincorana 
 Peperomia sirindhorniana 
 Peperomia sirupayana 
 Peperomia skottsbergii 
 Peperomia smithiana 
 Peperomia smithii 
 Peperomia sneidernii 
 Peperomia societatis 
 Peperomia socorronis 
 Peperomia sodiroi 
 Peperomia soratana 
 Peperomia soukupii 
 Peperomia spathophylla 
 Peperomia spathulata 
 Peperomia spathulifolia 
 Peperomia sphaerostachya 
 Peperomia spiculata 
 Peperomia spiritus-sancti 
 Peperomia spruceana 
 Peperomia sprucei 
 Peperomia steinbachii 
 Peperomia stelechophila 
 Peperomia stellata 
 Peperomia stenocarpa 
 Peperomia stenostachya 
 Peperomia stevensii 
 Peperomia steyermarkii 
 Peperomia stilifera 
 Peperomia stipitifolia 
 Peperomia stolonifera 
 Peperomia strawii 
 Peperomia striata 
 Peperomia stroemfeltii 
 Peperomia stuebelii 
 Peperomia suaveolens 
 Peperomia subalata 
 Peperomia subandina 
 Peperomia subblanda 
 Peperomia subcalvescens 
 Peperomia subelongata 
 Peperomia subemarginata 
 Peperomia subflaccida 
 Peperomia sublaxiflora 
 Peperomia subpallescens 
 Peperomia subpetiolata 
 Peperomia subpilosa 
 Peperomia subretusa 
 Peperomia subroseispica 
 Peperomia subrotunda 
 Peperomia subrotundifolia 
 Peperomia subrubescens 
 Peperomia subrubricaulis 
 Peperomia subrubrispica 
 Peperomia subsericata 
 Peperomia subsetifolia 
 Peperomia subspathulata 
 Peperomia subternifolia 
 Peperomia subvillicaulis 
 Peperomia succulenta 
 Peperomia suchitanensis 
 Peperomia sucumbiosensis 
 Peperomia sulbahiensis 
 Peperomia sulcata 
 Peperomia sumidoriana 
 Peperomia suratana 
 Peperomia suspensa 
 Peperomia swartziana 
 Peperomia sylvatica 
 Peperomia sylvestris 
 Peperomia sympodialis 
 Peperomia syringifolia

T

 Peperomia tablahuasiana 
 Peperomia talinifolia 
 Peperomia tamayoi 
 Peperomia tambitoensis 
 Peperomia tamboana 
 Peperomia tanalensis 
 Peperomia tancitaroana 
 Peperomia tarapotana 
 Peperomia tatei 
 Peperomia tejana 
 Peperomia tenae 
 Peperomia tenella 
 Peperomia tenelliformis 
 Peperomia tenerrima 
 Peperomia tenuicaulis 
 Peperomia tenuiflora 
 Peperomia tenuifolia 
 Peperomia tenuilimba 
 Peperomia tenuimarginata 
 Peperomia tenuipeduncula 
 Peperomia tenuipes 
 Peperomia tenuipila 
 Peperomia tenuiramea 
 Peperomia tenuissima 
 Peperomia tepoztecoana 
 Peperomia tequendamana 
 Peperomia terebinthina 
 Peperomia teresitensis 
 Peperomia ternata 
 Peperomia terraegaudens 
 Peperomia tetragona 
 Peperomia tetraphylla 
 Peperomia tetraquetra 
 Peperomia teysmannii 
 Peperomia theodori 
 Peperomia thienii 
 Peperomia thollonii 
 Peperomia thomeana 
 Peperomia thorelii 
 Peperomia ticunhuayana 
 Peperomia tillettii 
 Peperomia timbuchiana 
 Peperomia tjibodasana 
 Peperomia tlapacoyoensis 
 Peperomia toledoana 
 Peperomia tolimensis 
 Peperomia tomentella 
 Peperomia tomentosa 
 Peperomia tominana 
 Peperomia tonduzii 
 Peperomia tooviiana 
 Peperomia topoensis 
 Peperomia toroi 
 Peperomia tovariana 
 Peperomia tradescantiifolia 
 Peperomia transparens 
 Peperomia trianae 
 Peperomia trichobracteata 
 Peperomia trichocarpa 
 Peperomia trichomanoides 
 Peperomia trichophylla 
 Peperomia trichopus 
 Peperomia tricolor 
 Peperomia trifolia 
 Peperomia trinervis 
 Peperomia trinervula 
 Peperomia trineura 
 Peperomia trineuroides 
 Peperomia triplinervis 
 Peperomia tristachya 
 Peperomia trollii 
 Peperomia tropaeoloides 
 Peperomia trujilloi 
 Peperomia truncicola 
 Peperomia truncigaudens 
 Peperomia trunciseda 
 Peperomia truncivaga 
 Peperomia tsakiana 
 Peperomia tuberculata 
 Peperomia tubericordata 
 Peperomia tuberosa 
 Peperomia tuerckheimii 
 Peperomia tuisana 
 Peperomia tumida 
 Peperomia tungurahuae 
 Peperomia turbinata 
 Peperomia turboensis 
 Peperomia turialvensis 
 Peperomia tutensis 
 Peperomia tutuilana 
 Peperomia tutunendoana

U

 Peperomia uaupesensis 
 Peperomia ubate-susanensis 
 Peperomia udimontana 
 Peperomia udisilvestris 
 Peperomia umbilicata 
 Peperomia umbrigaudens 
 Peperomia umbrosa 
 Peperomia uncatispica 
 Peperomia undeninervia 
 Peperomia unduavina 
 Peperomia unifoliata 
 Peperomia unispicata 
 Peperomia urbani 
 Peperomia urocarpa 
 Peperomia ursina 
 Peperomia urvilleana

V

 Peperomia valladolidana 
 Peperomia vallensis 
 Peperomia valliculae 
 Peperomia vana 
 Peperomia vareschii 
 Peperomia variculata 
 Peperomia variifolia 
 Peperomia variilimba 
 Peperomia vazquezii 
 Peperomia vellarimalica 
 Peperomia velloziana 
 Peperomia velutina 
 Peperomia venabulifolia 
 Peperomia veneciana 
 Peperomia venezueliana 
 Peperomia venosa 
 Peperomia ventenatii 
 Peperomia ventricosicarpa 
 Peperomia venulosa 
 Peperomia venusta 
 Peperomia veraguana 
 Peperomia verediana 
 Peperomia verruculosa 
 Peperomia verschaffeltii 
 Peperomia versicolor 
 Peperomia versteegii 
 Peperomia verticillata 
 Peperomia verticillatispica 
 Peperomia vestita 
 Peperomia vidaliana 
 Peperomia villarrealii 
 Peperomia villicaulis 
 Peperomia villipetiola 
 Peperomia villosa 
 Peperomia vinasiana 
 Peperomia vincentiana 
 Peperomia violacea 
 Peperomia viracochana 
 Peperomia vitiana 
 Peperomia vitilevuensis 
 Peperomia vueltasana 
 Peperomia vulcanica 
 Peperomia vulcanicola

W

 Peperomia warmingii 
 Peperomia weberbaueri 
 Peperomia wernerrauhii 
 Peperomia wheeleri 
 Peperomia wibomii 
 Peperomia williamsii 
 Peperomia wolfgang-krahnii 
 Peperomia woytkowskii 
 Peperomia wrayi

X

 Peperomia xalana

Y

 Peperomia yabucoana 
 Peperomia yanacachiana 
 Peperomia yananoensis 
 Peperomia yapasana 
 Peperomia yatuensis 
 Peperomia yeracuiana 
 Peperomia yungasana 
 Peperomia yutajensis

Z

 Peperomia zarzalana 
 Peperomia zipaquirana 
 Peperomia zongolicana

References

External links
Peperomia.net
Peperomia – Integrated Taxonomic Information System

Peperomia